Vanadium(III) sulfate is the inorganic compound with the formula V2(SO4)3.  It is a pale yellow solid that is stable to air, in contrast to most vanadium(III) compounds.  It slowly dissolves in water to give the green aquo complex [V(H2O)6]3+.

The compound is prepared by treating V2O5 in sulfuric acid with elemental sulfur: 
V2O5  +  S  +  3 H2SO4   →   V2(SO4)3  +  SO2  +  3 H2O
This transformation is a rare example of a reduction by elemental sulfur.

When heated in vacuum at or slightly below 410 °C, it decomposes into vanadyl sulfate (VOSO4) and SO2. Vanadium(III) sulfate is stable in dry air but upon exposure to moist air for several weeks forms a green hydrate form.

Vanadium(III) sulfate is a reducing agent.

References

Vanadium(III) compounds
Sulfates